James Henry Dalziel, 1st Baron Dalziel of Kirkcaldy PC (24 April 1868 – 15 July 1935), known as Sir Henry Dalziel, Bt, between 1918 and 1921, was a British newspaper proprietor, Liberal politician and supporter of David Lloyd George.

Background and education
Dalziel was born in Borgue, Kirkcudbrightshire, the son of James Dalziel (died 1904), a shoemaker. He was educated at Borgue Academy, Shrewsbury High School, and King's College London.

Career
Originally a journalist, Dalziel became Member of Parliament (MP) for Kirkcaldy Burghs in 1892. He was also an outspoken advocate of home rule for Scotland, Ireland and Wales. After his retirement he joined the National Party of Scotland.

In 1914 he became sole owner of Reynolds's News, in which he had long had a financial interest. He also bought the Pall Mall Gazette in 1917 and the same year was given the Freedom of the City of Kirkcaldy. Lloyd George made him chairman and political director of the Daily Chronicle in 1918. He sold all his newspaper interests in 1922.

Honours
Dalziel was knighted in 1908, and appointed to the Privy Council in 1912. He was created a Baronet, of Brooklands, Chobham, in the County of Surrey, in 1918. Dalziel was raised to the peerage as Baron Dalziel of Kirkcaldy, of Marylebone in the County of London, in the 1921 Birthday Honours.

Personal life
Lord Dalziel of Kirkcaldy married Amy (née Thackery), widow of Donald Macreae, in July 1928 at the British Embassy in Paris. They had no children. He died in July 1935, aged 67, whereupon the baronetcy and barony became extinct.

References

External links 
 

1868 births
1935 deaths
People from Dumfries and Galloway
Dalziel of Kirkcaldy
Baronets in the Baronetage of the United Kingdom
Members of the Privy Council of the United Kingdom
20th-century British newspaper publishers (people)
Scottish journalists
Knights Bachelor
Members of the Parliament of the United Kingdom for Fife constituencies
Scottish Liberal Party MPs
UK MPs 1886–1892
UK MPs 1892–1895
UK MPs 1895–1900
UK MPs 1900–1906
UK MPs 1906–1910
UK MPs 1910
UK MPs 1910–1918
UK MPs 1918–1922
UK MPs who were granted peerages
Alumni of King's College London
Barons created by George V